Lyropupa perlonga is an extinct species of air-breathing land snail, terrestrial pulmonate gastropod mollusks in the family Pupillidae. This species was endemic to the Hawaiian Archipelago.

References

Lyropupa
Extinct gastropods
Taxonomy articles created by Polbot